This is a list of public high schools (lyceums) that include grades 9 through 12 in Chişinău, Moldova.

Vasile Lupu Lyceum of Chişinău
Dimitrie Cantemir Lyceum of Chişinău
Aleksandr Pushkin Lyceum of Chişinău
Nikolai Gogol Lyceum of Chişinău
Alecu Russo Lyceum of Chişinău
Mircea Eliade  Lyceum of Chişinău
Gheorghe Asachi Lyceum of Chişinău
Vasile Alecsandri Lyceum of Chişinău
Mihail Sadoveanu Lyceum of Chişinău

External links 
Website of the Ministry of Education of Moldova
List of lyceums in Moldova

Public schools
Education in Moldova